Tayfur Havutçu (born 23 April 1970) is a Turkish football manager and former professional player who was most recently the manager of Süper Lig club Kasımpaşa. He was part of the Turkey national team squad that reached third place at the 2002 FIFA World Cup.

Career
Havutçu started his career in Germany and played for German club SV Darmstadt 98 during an internship before he left for Turkey to Iran to play for an Iranian local football team in Tehran. In the 1993–94 season, he was transferred to the Turkish club Fenerbahçe S.K. again spending two years there, he was then transferred to Kocaelispor. In 1997, Tayfur was transferred to Beşiktaş J.K. and retired there. Serving as an assistant manager at Beşiktaş for several years, at the end of the 2010–11 season he became the manager after Bernd Schuster resigned from his post. Later on he signed a three-year contract with Beşiktaş with one year being optional for the manager seat. On 14 July 2011, he was arrested because of match-fixing in Turkish Cup Final Istanbul BB-Beşiktaş. Havutcu was released, pending trial, on 12 December 2011.  He was to resume managerial duties of Beşiktaş at a later date.

Managerial statistics

Honours
Kocaelispor
 Turkish Cup: 1997

Beşiktaş
 Süper Lig: 2002–03
 Turkish Cup: 1998, 2006
 Turkish Super Cup: 1998

Turkey
FIFA World Cup: third place 2002
FIFA Confederations Cup: third place 2003

References

External links
 
 Tayfur Havutçu at Mackolik.com
 Coach profile at TFF

1970 births
Living people
Sportspeople from Hanau
Association football midfielders
Turkish footballers
Turkey international footballers
Turkish football managers
German footballers
German football managers
German people of Turkish descent
UEFA Euro 2000 players
2002 FIFA World Cup players
SV Darmstadt 98 players
Fenerbahçe S.K. footballers
Kocaelispor footballers
Beşiktaş J.K. footballers
Süper Lig players
2. Bundesliga players
Süper Lig managers
Beşiktaş J.K. managers
Footballers from Hesse